The Singer Manufacturing–South Bend Lathe Co. Historic District is a national historic district located at South Bend, St. Joseph County, Indiana.  It encompasses four contributing buildings, one additional contributing structures, and one further contributing site. It developed between about 1868 and 1947, and includes notable examples of Late Victorian style industrial architecture.  The buildings are associated with the Singer Manufacturing Company and its successors. They include the original three-story, brick Singer Manufacturing Company building (1868), Singer Manufacturing Company / South Bend Lathe complex (c. 1870–1875, and later), and Singer Manufacturing Company Employees Club Room / Supply Building (1893).

It was listed on the National Register of Historic Places in 1999.

References

Historic districts on the National Register of Historic Places in Indiana
Industrial buildings and structures on the National Register of Historic Places in Indiana
Victorian architecture in Indiana
Historic districts in South Bend, Indiana
National Register of Historic Places in St. Joseph County, Indiana